Alexandra de Blas (born 1965) is an Australian journalist and environmentalist who was awarded the 2003 3rd World Water Forum Journalists prize in Kyoto, Japan and the 2004 United Nations Association of Australia World Environment Day Award.

She is best known as presenter of the ABC Radio National environment program Earthbeat. Since 2004, de Blas has been on the Editorial Advisory Board of CSIRO's Ecos magazine and currently runs an environment communications agency.

Education and early life 

de Blas completed a Bachelor of Science degree at the University of Sydney in 1985 and later completed a Graduate Diploma in Environmental Studies (Hons) at the  University of Tasmania in 1992. She spent several years working on a PhD in environmental communication at the University but returned to the ABC before it was completed.

Career 

de Blas started work as a Rural Reporter for the ABC in Queensland. She later worked on the ABC Radio program 'The Country Hour,' reporting from Tasmania and Victoria.

Controversy emerged in connection with de Blas' research into pollution from the Mt Lyell copper mine in Tasmania which she uncovered while researching her honours thesis in environmental studies at the University of Tasmania.

The Mt Lyell Mine Co threatened the University of Tasmania with a defamation suit if the thesis was published and the University decided that the work was defamatory and should not be published.

After two years of attempting to reverse the decision, de Blas took her thesis to the University of Technology where it was published by the Australian Centre for Independent Journalism.

In 1997, de Blas was engaged as the Presenter/Producer for the Radio National environment program Earthbeat, a position she held until the program's demise in 2005.
From 2005 to 2008 Alexandra worked at Bush Heritage Australia as their Communications Strategist.

Bibliography

 The National Business Leaders Forum: Leading the Sustainability Business, Ecos, 161, July –Aug 2011
 New Intelligence on Saving City Stormwater, Ecos, 159, March 2011
 Ground Breaking Models give Fragmented Landscapes New Hope, Ecos, 158, Dec-Jan 2010/11
 Antarctic Penguin Colonies Threatened by Changing Climate, The Science Show, ABC RN 13 Nov 2010
 Cleaning Up Storm Water, By Design, ABC RN 18 Aug 2010
 Science Sceptics and Spin: Framing the Climate Change Debate, Ecos 156 Aug-Sept 2010
 Engaging Visions: The Exhibition, Artworks Feature, ABC RN,  12 Sept 2010
 Making the Shift from Consumerism To Sustainability Ecos 153 Feb-Mar 2010
 Ozone Layer Wind Shifts Create Moment of Grace, Ecos, 153, Feb-Mar 2010
 Sherpas Report Glaciers Going, Going, Gone Science Show, ABC RN, 30 Jan 2010
 The REDD Scheme: The REDD Approach to Protecting Green Carbon Ecos 151 Oct-Nov 2009
 Decline of Birds in Victorian Forests, Science Show ABC RN 5 Dec 2009
 Climate Action and Social Justice: Acting in Good Faith Ecos Oct-Nov 2009
 Australia's Safe Climate Vision Future Tense, ABC RN, 23 July 2009
 Sustainable Commitments Insulate Financial Leaders Ecos 149 Jun-Jul 2009
 Engaging Visions, Artworks Feature, ABC RN, 9 Nov 2008
 Healing by the Community Spirit, Ecos, 145 Oct-Nov 2008
 Climate Code Red: the Case for Emergency Action, Ecos, 144 Aug- Sept 2008
 Earthbeat ABC RN Weekly Environment Show presented by Alexandra de Blas 1997-2005

References

Living people
Australian freelance journalists
Australian environmentalists
Australian women environmentalists
Australian women writers
1965 births